Pterocerina is a genus of picture-winged flies in the family Ulidiidae.

Species

 Pterocerina acutipennis
 Pterocerina alboguttata
 Pterocerina americana
 Pterocerina anastrepha
 Pterocerina angulata
 Pterocerina basalis
 Pterocerina bifasciata
 Pterocerina clarifascia
 Pterocerina colorata
 Pterocerina costalimai
 Pterocerina fenestrata
 Pterocerina ferruginea
 Pterocerina furcata
 Pterocerina garleppi
 Pterocerina hendeli
 Pterocerina interrupta
 Pterocerina nigricauda
 Pterocerina nigripennis
 Pterocerina nigripes
 Pterocerina obliteratella
 Pterocerina ochracea
 Pterocerina pallidibasis
 Pterocerina paradoxa
 Pterocerina picea
 Pterocerina plurifurcata
 Pterocerina psidii
 Pterocerina ruficauda
 Pterocerina scalaris
 Pterocerina stylata
 Pterocerina townsendi
 Pterocerina trifasciata

References

 
Ulidiidae
Brachycera genera